Christian Gaudin (born 13 January 1950) is a former member of the Senate of France, who represented the Maine-et-Loire department. He is a member of the Centrist Union.

References
 Page on the Senate website 

1950 births
Living people
French Senators of the Fifth Republic
Senators of Maine-et-Loire
Place of birth missing (living people)
Prefects of the French Southern and Antarctic Lands